Gerhard Kische (born 23 October 1951 in Teterow) is a former German football player.

Kische played for FC Hansa Rostock from 1970 to 1981.

On the national level, he played for the East Germany national team (59 and 63 matches respectively), and was a participant at the 1974 FIFA World Cup. He won gold at the 1976 Olympic football competition. He won his first cap in 1971 against Mexico.

References

External links
 
 
 

1951 births
Living people
People from Teterow
German footballers
East German footballers
Footballers from Mecklenburg-Western Pomerania
1974 FIFA World Cup players
FC Hansa Rostock players
Footballers at the 1976 Summer Olympics
Olympic footballers of East Germany
Olympic gold medalists for East Germany
East Germany international footballers
Olympic medalists in football
DDR-Oberliga players
Medalists at the 1976 Summer Olympics
Association football defenders
Recipients of the Patriotic Order of Merit in silver